The Shield's Final Chapter was a professional wrestling livestreaming event produced by WWE. It was held for wrestlers from the promotion's Raw, SmackDown, and 205 Live brand divisions. A portion of the live event aired exclusively on the WWE Network as a one-hour special. It took place on April 21, 2019, at TaxSlayer Center in Moline, Illinois. This event marked the final match for The Shield (Dean Ambrose, Roman Reigns, and Seth Rollins) as a group, as well as Ambrose's final match in WWE.

Seven matches were contested on the card, three of which were shown for the one-hour WWE Network special. In the main event, The Shield defeated Baron Corbin, Bobby Lashley, and Drew McIntyre in a six-man tag team match.

Production

Background
In 2015, WWE began to expand its content on the WWE Network by presenting televised house shows. These one-hour WWE Network-exclusive specials did not show the entire card, but only a select few matches. The Shield's Final Chapter took place on April 21, 2019, at TaxSlayer Center in Moline, Illinois and featured wrestlers from the Raw, SmackDown, and 205 Live brands. The one-hour WWE Network special was livestreamed.

Storylines
The card composed of seven matches, three of which were shown for the one-hour WWE Network special. The matches resulted from scripted storylines, where wrestlers portrayed heroes, villains, or less distinguishable characters in scripted events that built tension and culminated in a wrestling match or series of matches. Results were predetermined by WWE's writers on the Raw, SmackDown, and 205 Live brands, while storylines were produced on WWE's weekly television shows, Monday Night Raw, SmackDown Live, and the cruiserweight-exclusive 205 Live.

On January 29, 2019, WWE confirmed that Dean Ambrose had decided to not renew his contract that was expiring in April. The following month, Roman Reigns, who took time off in October 2018 due to leukemia, returned. Ambrose, Reigns, and Seth Rollins then reunited The Shield for a match at Fastlane, where they defeated the team of Baron Corbin, Bobby Lashley, and Drew McIntyre. Although this had been promoted as The Shield's final match together, one further match was scheduled for a special event called The Shield's Final Chapter, featuring both The Shield as a group and Ambrose's last match in WWE.

Results

References 

Shield's Final Chapter
2019 in Illinois
Events in Moline, Illinois
Events in Illinois
April 2019 events in the United States
Professional wrestling in Illinois